Podarcis carbonelli, commonly known as Carbonell's wall lizard, is a species of lizard in the family Lacertidae. The species is native to Portugal and Spain.

This lizard reaches a total length (including tail) of 20 cm (8 in), and feeds primarily on small invertebrates such as insects, arachnids, and snails. Its natural habitats are temperate shrublands and sandy shores. Habitat loss threatens its survival.

Etymology
The specific name, carbonelli, is in honor of "J. Carbonell" who is the wife of Pérez-Mellado.

Description
Females tend to be slightly larger than males in some localities. The dorsal surface is usually grey or brown, but is sometimes green (especially so in males), copiously speckled with rows of dark markings. The flanks may also be somewhat greenish with reticulated, dark markings. The underparts are whitish and there are often small blue spots along the edge of the belly. It differs from all other Iberian Wall Lizards by generally showing greenish flanks but no green backs.

Carbonell's wall lizard much resembles the closely related Bocage's wall lizard, but that species tends to have more clearly defined markings and a yellow, orange or pink belly, and shows no green flanks and no blue outer ventral scales.

Distribution and habitat
Carbonell's wall lizard is native to Portugal and Spain. Its geographic range consists of a number of isolated populations in western and central Portugal, another in Coto Doñana in southwestern Spain and a separate subspecies is present on the Berlenga Islands off the coast of Portugal. Being specialized on Mediterranean climates with cool to warm summers, it has stable populations at the Atlantic coast, occupying sand dunes with barely any vegetation.

Behaviour
Carbonell's wall lizard is often seen on dry banks where it may be present in large numbers. It takes refuge in cracks and among tree roots.

Diet
P. carbonelli feeds mainly on arthropods but, particularly on the Berlenga Islands, also consumes snails.

Reproduction
P. carbonelli is oviparous. In central Portugal there is usually one clutch of two eggs each year, but in the Berlengas, several clutches of up to four eggs are laid. These take ten to fifteen weeks to hatch.

Status
It lives in oak woodland and shrubland and although some populations are in protected areas, others are subject to habitat degradation. Although it is common in some suitable habitats, in general the population is thought to be declining and the International Union for Conservation of Nature has assessed it as being an "endangered species".

References

Further reading
Pérez-Mellado, Valentin (1981). "Nuevos datos sobre la sistemática y distribucion de Podarcis bocagei (Seoane, 1884) (Sauria, Lacertidae) en la Península Ibérica ". Amphibia-Reptilia 2: 259-265. (Podarcis bocagei carbonelli, new subspecies). (in Spanish).
Sá-Sousa, Paulo; Harris, D. James (2002). "Podarcis carbonelli Pérez-Mellado, 1981 is a distinct species". Amphibia-Reptilia 23 (4): 459-468.

See Also 
The Italian wall lizard, a related species.

carbonelli
Reptiles described in 1981
Lizards of Europe
Endemic reptiles of the Iberian Peninsula
Taxa named by Valentín Pérez-Mellado
Taxonomy articles created by Polbot